James Edward Allen  (born June 18, 1985) is an American country music singer and songwriter. He is signed to Broken Bow Records imprint Stoney Creek, for which he has released the two singles "Best Shot" and "Make Me Want To" and the 2018 album Mercury Lane. In 2021, he won the Country Music Association Award for New Artist of the Year, the second black artist to do so since Darius Rucker in 2009.

Early life
Allen was born in Milton, Delaware, United States, but moved to Nashville, Tennessee, in 2007. During most of his first few years in Nashville, he experienced poverty and often lived out of his car. He auditioned for the tenth season of American Idol, but was cut before the live voting rounds. While on American Idol, he performed with Colton Dixon during one of the group rounds and befriended Scotty McCreery, who eventually won the competition that year. Allen and McCreery later reconnected and toured together after the release of Allen's debut album.

Career
Allen signed a publishing deal with Wide Open Music, a songwriting imprint formed by singer-songwriter Ash Bowers, in 2016. After doing a talent showcase for representatives of Broken Bow Records in early 2017, he was signed to that label's Stoney Creek imprint and released his self-titled debut EP, which Bowers produced. The label's executive vice president said that the decision to sign Allen was one of the fastest they ever made at the label. Stephen Thomas Erlewine of AllMusic compared the EP's sound to the "slick, assured style" of Thomas Rhett and Sam Hunt. Similarly, Rolling Stone Country writer Brittney McKenna compared Allen's contemporary R&B influences to those artists and Maren Morris. A track from the EP, "Blue Jean Baby", was added to Spotify's "United States Viral 50 chart".

His first official single, "Best Shot", was released in early 2018. The week of its release, it was the second most-added song to country music radio playlists. The song has made the Hot Country Songs, Country Airplay, and Billboard Hot 100 charts and was made into a music video. Allen said that the song's title and central theme were inspired by his grandmother and his son, who was 4 at the time of the song's release. His debut album, Mercury Lane, was issued in October 2018. Also produced by Bowers, the album takes its name from the street on which Allen lived as a child. "Best Shot" was a Number One hit on the Billboard Country Airplay chart in November 2018, making him the first Black artist to send his debut single to the top of that chart. The album's second single, "Make Me Want To" released to country radio on February 1, 2019, and it also became a Number One hit on the Billboard Country Airplay chart.

Allen also recorded a cover of Lady Gaga and Bradley Cooper's "Shallow" with Abby Anderson in May 2019. The recording was made into a video as well.

In 2020, Allen released "This Is Us", a duet with Noah Cyrus. It was included on his new EP, Bettie James, which was released on July 10, 2020. The project's second single was "Freedom Was a Highway," a duet with Brad Paisley, which was released on February 1, 2021. It became Allen's third Number One hit and Paisley's twentieth on the Billboard Country Airplay in February 2022. 

Allen became the first Black solo performer to win New Male Artist of the Year at the 2021 ACM Awards (at which he also performed a duet with Brad Paisley). In September 2021, Allen was announced as one of the celebrities competing on season 30 of Dancing with the Stars. He and his partner Emma Slater were the ninth couple to be eliminated, ultimately placing 7th.

On November 10, 2021, he won New Artist of the Year at the CMA Awards. 15 days later, he performed at the Macy's Thanksgiving Day Parade. In February 2022, Allen announced that he would be a guest mentor on American Idol (season 20).

He also featured on Noah Shnacky's "Don't You Wanna Know" for his 2022 album Thoughtfully Reckless and a duet with Nick Carter in "Easy".

Allen release the lead-off single, "Down Home," to his third studio album Tulip Drive on March 8, 2022. The album was released on June 24, 2022.

Tours
Headlining 
Down Home Tour (2022)

Supporting
Brad Paisley 2021 Tour (2021) (with Brad Paisley)
The Denim & Rhinestones Tour (2022–23) (with Carrie Underwood)

Discography

Albums

Extended plays

Singles

Other charted songs

Music videos

Notes

References

External links

 
1985 births 
21st-century African-American male singers
BBR Music Group artists
American country singer-songwriters
American Idol participants
American male singer-songwriters
African-American country musicians 
African-American songwriters
Country musicians from Delaware 
Living people
People from Milton, Delaware